Zuber is a surname. Notable people with the surname include:

Andreas Zuber (born 1983), Austrian race car driver
Barbara Zuber (1926–2019), American painter and illustrator
Bill Zuber (1913–1982), American baseball pitcher
Catherine Zuber (born 1951), British costume designer
Christian Joseph Zuber (1736–1802), Danish architect
Edward Zuber (born 1932), Canadian artist
Eric Zuber (born 1985), American pianist
Etta Zuber Falconer (1933–2002), American mathematician
Inês Zuber (born 1980), Portuguese politician and MEP
Isaiah Zuber (born 1997), American football player
Jean-Bernard Zuber, French theoretical physicist
Jon Zuber (born 1969), American baseball player
Marc Zuber (1944–2003), British actor
Maria Zuber (born 1958), American astronomer
Steven Zuber (born 1991), Swiss footballer
Terence Zuber (born 1948), American historian
Tom Zuber (born 1972), American attorney and entrepreneur
Tyler Zuber (born 1995), American professional baseball player

German-language surnames
Occupational surnames